Jari Rouvinen is a Finnish male curler and curling coach.

At the national level, he is a four-time Finnish men's champion curler (2003, 2007, 2008, 2015) and two-time Finnish junior champion curler (2001, 2002).

He started curling in 2001.

Teams

Record as a coach of national teams

References

External links

Living people
Finnish male curlers
Finnish curling champions
Finnish curling coaches
Date of birth missing (living people)
Place of birth missing (living people)
Year of birth missing (living people)
21st-century Finnish people